The Aga Khan Development Network (AKDN) is a network of private, non-denominational (de jure) development agencies founded by the Aga Khan that work primarily in the poorest parts of Asia and Africa. Aga Khan IV succeeded to the office of the 49th hereditary Imam as spiritual and administrative leader of the Shia faith-rooted Nizari Ismaili Muslim supranational union in 1957. Ismailis consist of an estimated 25–30 million adherents (about 20% of the world's Shia Muslim population).

The network focuses on health, education, culture, rural development, institution building and the promotion of economic development. The AKDN aims to improve living conditions and opportunities for the poor, without regard to their faith, origin or gender. Its annual budget for not-for-profit activities is approximately US $ 950 million – mainly in Africa, Asia, and the Middle East. The AKDN works in 30 countries around the world, and it employs approx 96,000 paid staff, mostly in developing countries. While the agencies are secular, they are guided by Islamic ethics, which bridge faith and society.

AKDN agencies 

AKDN agencies work towards the elimination of global poverty; the promotion and implementation of pluralism; the advancement of the status of women; and the honouring of Islamic art and architecture.

The following is a list of AKDN agencies:

Collectively they are leading development organisations around the world, focusing on the improving the livelihoods of Ismailis. The Aga Khan's secular development institutions – such as AKDN and AKRSP – provide services and direction for sustainable development around the world.

The Aga Khan Fund for Economic Development with its affiliates, Tourism Promotion Services, Industrial Promotion Services, and the Aga Khan Agency for Microfinance, seek to strengthen the role of the private sector in developing countries by supporting private sector initiatives in the development process. The fund and the foundation also encourage government policies that foster what the Aga Khan first called an enabling environment of favourable legislative and fiscal structures.

The agencies' common goal is to help the poor achieve a level of self-reliance whereby they are able to plan their own livelihoods and help those even more needy than themselves. To pursue their mandates, AKDN institutions rely on volunteers as well as remunerated professionals.

AKDN focuses on civil society with the Civil Society Programme. A number of organizations are sponsored by the World Bank with the help of partner foundations.

The Aga Khan Trust for Culture co-ordinates the Imamat's cultural activities. Its programmes include the Aga Khan Award for Architecture, the Aga Khan Historic Cities Programme, and the Education and Culture Programme. The trust also provides financial support for the Aga Khan Program for Islamic Architecture at Harvard University and the Massachusetts Institute of Technology in the United States, and also support to cultural development and preservation with the Award for Architecture, Aga Khan Trust for Culture (AKTC), Historic Cities, Museums & Exhibitions, Islamic Architecture, Music.

The Aga Khan Fund for Economic Development (AKFED), Aga Khan Agency for Microfinance (AKAM), Financial Services, Industrial Promotion, Tourism Promotion, Media, Aviation Services are some of the agencies and programs offered for economic development.

In the field of education AKDN has the Aga Khan Education Services (AKES), Aga Khan University (AKU), Aga Khan Academies (AKA) and the University of Central Asia (UCA).

Rural development

In Gilgit-Baltistan, Pakistan, the Aga Khan Foundation plays a central role in helping the entire village or collection of villages improve their standards of living.

The Aga Khan Foundation (AKF) is striving to help mitigate educational and food scarcity in several disadvantaged East African communities. The AKF has partnered with organizations in rural regions of Kenya and Tanzania to augment their economic capacity. Programs in Kenya have built over 120 dams and small farm reservoirs to help increase water accessibility, along with water pipes for schools and hospitals. Programs in Tanzania have focused on helping to train farmers on sustainable agricultural practices in their harsh and unpredictable climate. Through these programs the AKF hopes to increase agricultural yields and incomes for the neglected rural regions within both countries. .

Long-term commitment 
The AKDN agencies make a long-term commitment to the areas in which they work, guided by the philosophy that a humane, sustainable environment must reflect the choices made by people themselves of how they live and wish to improve their prospects.

AKDN institutions work in close partnership with the world's major national and international aid and development agencies. The AKDN itself is an independent self-governing system of agencies, institutions, and programmes under the leadership of the Ismaili Imamat. One of their sources of support are the Ismaili community with its tradition of philanthropy, voluntary service and self-reliance, and the leadership and material underwriting of the hereditary Imam and Imamat resources.

Philosophy of AKDN 
The Aga Khan Development Network's mandate is to improve the quality of life for the most vulnerable. This mandate guides the network of AKDN institutions active in more than 35 underdeveloped countries to provide support in the fields of health care, education and economics. In doing so, they strive to become a symbol of hope for the under-privileged people.

Highlighting the functions and philosophy of Aga Khan Development Network (AKDN),

Partners 
The AKDN partners with like-minded institutions in the design, implementation and funding of innovative development projects. Partners included governments of many nations: Afghanistan, Australia, Canada, Côte d'Ivoire, Czech Republic, Denmark, Democratic Republic of Congo, Egypt, in Europe, Finland, France, Germany, Greece, India, Japan, Kenya, Kazakhstan, Kyrgyz Republic, Malaysia, Mali, Mozambique, the Netherlands, New Zealand, Norway, Pakistan, Portugal, Spain, Sweden, Switzerland, Syria, Tajikistan, Tanzania, Zanzibar, Uganda, United Kingdom and many governmental agencies in the United States.

The AKDN is one of the first Global Alliance Founding Partners, who will be providing funding for the Earthshot Prize, launched in October 2020 by Prince William in partnership with Sir David Attenborough through The Royal Foundation. Between 2021 and 2030, five prizes of £1 million will be awarded annually to recipients who identify solutions to global environmental problems.

See also
Nizari Ismaili state

References

External links
The Aga Khan Development Network website
Aga Khan Agency for Habitat
An Islamic Conscience: the Aga Khan and the Ismailis - a film on the Aga Khan and his development work

 
International development agencies